The 1967 SANFL Grand Final was an Australian rules football competition.  beat Port Adelaide by 88 to 77.

References 

SANFL Grand Finals
SANFL Grand Final, 1967